Injected was an American hard rock band from Atlanta, Georgia. Active from 1995-2005 and for brief periods until 2016, the band released two full length LPs: 2002's Burn It Black and 2016's The Truth About You.

Influenced by groups such as Quicksand, Helmet and Mötley Crüe, the band was known for their raucous live performances as well as their melody and songwriting.  

The band's major label debut, Burn It Black, was critically acclaimed, with Metallica's Lars Ulrich nominating it for the Shortlist Prize in 2002, as well as appearing on Eddie Trunk's year-end top 10 list for 2002.

History

Formation and early years
The band was formed in 1995 by high school friends D Grady (lead vocals/guitar), Chris Wojtal (drums), and Steve Slovisky (bass).  In 1996 they released their first full length CD, Hammered and Enamored. Lead guitarist Jade Lemons would join the band soon after, as the band also moonlit as an 1980s cover band, 'Airbrush Johnson'.

In 1999, as the band amassed a large buzz in the Atlanta music scene, lead vocalist D Grady approached Marvelous 3 vocalist Butch Walker to produce new material for another independent release.  The subsequent material, recorded at Walker's Ruby Red Studios, would end up on the band's major label debut.

Burn It Black
In 2000 the band signed with Island/Def Jam records. The band relocated to Bearsville Studios in upstate New York to record the remainder of Burn It Black. The album was mixed by Rich Costey (Audioslave, Muse, Cave In)  at Larribee East.

During the promotional tour for their debut, the band toured with Oleander, Local H,Fu Manchu, Marvelous 3. The band would also join the MTV Campus Invasion tour in 2002. Guitarist Jade Lemons would depart the band in 2002.

Songs from the album would appear on several movie soundtracks:   Spider-Man: Music from and Inspired By Original Motion Picture Soundtrack, The Scorpion King and More Fast and Furious.

Follow up to Burn It Black
After the completing the tour for their debut, the band enlisted producer/engineer Nick DiDia to produce their sophomore major-label album.  During the recording of the album almost all of the executive team that had signed the band left Island/Def Jam, including label head Lyor Cohen. The second album was never released by Island Records, and the label and band would eventually part ways.

Hiatus
At some point in 2005 vocalist/guitarist D Grady put the band's music on hiatus to focus on fatherhood, remarking: "There’s a narcissism in being an artist that I felt, perhaps incorrectly, that was incompatible with parenthood".

Even though the bands second album did not immediately see the light of day, songs written for it still found their way to major-label releases. Butch Walker's second solo album Letters included "So At Last", penned by lead vocalist D Grady.  American Idol winner and Injected fan David Cook included the track "Barbasol" on his self-titled debut album.  The song was released as a single in March, 2009 as a double-A side with "Come Back To Me".

Reunions
The original line up, including lead guitarist Jade Lemons, would reunite one final time in 2009, playing the charity event 500 Songs For Kids. Lemons and Grady would reunite one final time in 2012, playing an acoustic set at Eddie's Attic.

In April of 2016 guitarist Jade Lemons passed away.

The Truth About You
After guitarist Jade Lemons passing, lead vocalist D Grady decided to release the final material featuring both of them. Grady had re-recorded The Truth About You with drummer Kyle Spence (Harvey Milk, Kurt Vile, Dinosaur Jr.) at Spence's studio in Athens, Ga and featured Lemons on many of the tracks.

Band members
 Danny Grady – vocals, guitar
 Matt Pruitt – guitar
 Steve Slovisky – bass
 Chris Wojtal – drums
 Jade Lemons – guitar, vocals (died 2016)

Discography

Studio albums
 Burn It Black (2002) (No. 149 Billboard 200, No. 7 Top Heatseekers)

Singles

Soundtracks
 WWE Tough Enough 2 – song: "Faithless"
 Music from and Inspired by Spider-Man – song: "I-IV-V"
 The Scorpion King – song: "Burn It Black"
 99Xmas Soundtrack Volume II – song: Christmas ("Baby Please Come Home") (U2 cover)
 Fast and the Furious – song: "Faithless"
 Project Gotham Racing 2 – song: "Burn It Black"

References

External links
 Official website
 A fan site

American post-grunge musical groups
Musical groups from Georgia (U.S. state)